Rogério Santos may refer to:

Rogério dos Santos (judoka) (born 1962), Brazilian judoka
Rogério dos Santos (footballer) (born 1987), Brazilian footballer

See also
Rogério Pinheiro (born 1972), full name Rogério Pinheiro dos Santos, Brazilian footballer